Kurree Sharif is a large village of Gujrat District in the Punjab province of Pakistan. It is located at 32°31'10N 74°12'55E with an altitude of 220 metres (725 feet) and is about 45 km north east of Gujrat city and about 25 km from the city of Sialkot. It is perched atop a small hillock which overlooks the Marala Headworks at the very juncture where the Chenab River winds its way into Pakistan. This village comes under the administrative jurisdiction of Union Council Mari Khokhran. The nearby villages are Khalil Pur in the North, Marala Headworks in the East, BehlolPur, Mari Khokhran and shampur in the South. People of all these villages live very cordially like brothers with mutual respect and love for each other. Though the village falls under District Gujrat but it is located just 19 km from Sialkot City.

Demography 
The inhabitants are small-time farmers, however, shrinking family holdings due to land erosion caused by River has pushed people towards diversification of earning livelihood. 

The village has a population of around 8000. Agriculture, livestock, labour are the main source of income. Majority of the population is Muslim. There are a few Christian families also in the village. The main tribes in the village are the Jatt and Malik Kokhars..

History
Kurree Sharif is quite an old village. Before the Partition of India, this village had a major population of Sikhs and Hindus who migrated to India.
The village Kurree Sharif is famous for the shrines of saints and Mazar of Malik Jasrath Khokhar, the forefather of Jastral branch (Khokhar) of  Punjab.

Tourism 
The Marala Headworks (locally known as Head Marala) is a tourist spot which is located just about a kilometre from Kurree. Three Rivers entering Pakistan from India meet at this very place which gives a scenic view. These Rivers are Manawar Tawi, River Chenab and Jammu Tawi. Manawar Tawi passes just a half km from Kurree.

Notable people
Jasrath Khokhar
General Irfan Malik DG, C (ISI)

See also

 Sialkot
 Gakhars 
 Tanda, Gujrat
 Behlol Pur, Gujrat

References

Populated places in Gujrat District